The 1957 Scottish Cup Final was an association football match, the 72nd staging of the final of the Scottish Cup, Scottish football's most prestigious knock-out competition. The match took place at Hampden Park on 20 April 1957 and was contested by Division One clubs Falkirk and Kilmarnock. It was Falkirk's second appearance in the final and Kilmarnock's sixth.

As Division One clubs, both entered the tournament in the fifth round. Neither club won all four of their ties at the first attempt, Falkirk requiring a replay in the semi-final to knock out fellow Division One club Raith Rovers whom they defeated in the club's last appearance in the final in 1913. Falkirk defeated two Division Two clubs and another from Division One before the final. Kilmarnock needed a replay to knock out the club who defeated them in their last final appearance also, East Fife. They went on to eliminate the 1956 runners-up, Celtic, in the replayed semi-final.

It was only Falkirk's second appearance in the final, their first in 44 years since success in 1913. Kilmarnock were making their sixth appearance in their history, winning twice, the last victory coming in 1929.

The first match ended in a 1–1 draw. Falkirk took the lead after 33 minutes when John Prentice scored from the penalty spot after a foul by Willie Toner. Kilmarnock equalised in first half injury time with a goal from David Curlett. With no goals in the second half, the scores remained level to force a replay four days later. In the replay, Falkirk took the lead again through George Merchant. Kilmarnock again equalised with only 12 minutes until the end to see the match into extra time. Doug Moran scored the winning goal for Falkirk in the 101st minute of the match to seal victory for Falkirk and be crowned champions for the second time in its history.

Route to the final

Falkirk

Kilmarnock

Match details

Original

Replay

See also
1997 Scottish Cup Final, played between same teams

References

External links
 Video highlights (replay) from official Pathé News archive

1957
Cup Final
Falkirk F.C. matches
Kilmarnock F.C. matches
1950s in Glasgow